A skull cup is a drinking vessel or eating bowl made from an inverted human calvaria that has been cut away from the rest of the skull.  The use of a human skull as a drinking cup in ritual use or as a trophy is reported in numerous sources throughout history and among various peoples, and among Western cultures is most often associated with the historically nomadic cultures of the Eurasian Steppe.

The oldest directly dated skull cup at 14,700 cal BP  (12,750 BC) comes from Gough's Cave, Somerset, England. Skulls used as containers can be distinguished from plain skulls by exhibiting cut-marks from flesh removal and working to produce a regular lip.

Asia

The oldest record in the Chinese annals of the skull-cup tradition dates from the last years of the Spring and Autumn period, when the victors of the Battle of Jinyang in 453 BC made the skull of their enemy into a winecup. Later, the Records of the Grand Historian recorded the practice among the ancient Xiongnu of present-day Mongolia. Laoshang (or Jizhu), son of the Xiongnu chieftain Modu Chanyu, killed the king of the Yuezhi around 162 BC, and in accordance with their tradition, "made a drinking cup out of his skull". According to the biography of the envoy Zhang Qian in Han shu, the drinking cup made from the skull of the Yuezhi king was later used when the Xiongnu concluded a treaty with two Han ambassadors during the reign of Emperor Yuan of Han (49-33 BC). To seal the convention, the Chinese ambassadors drank blood from the skull cup with the Xiongnu chiefs.

In India and Tibet, the skull cup is known as a kapala, and is used in Buddhist tantric and Hindu tantric rituals. The skull does not belong to an enemy, and indeed the identity of the skull's original owner is not considered significant. Hindu deities such as Kali are sometimes depicted holding a kapala full of human blood. Many carved and elaborately mounted kapalas survive, mostly in Tibet.

In 1510, Shah Ismail I defeated and slew Muhammad Shaybani, founder of the Shaybanid Empire in present-day Uzbekistan, in battle. The Shah had his enemy's body dismembered and the parts were sent to various areas of the empire for display, while his skull was coated in gold and made into a jewelled drinking goblet.

In Japan, the famed warlord Oda Nobunaga led a number of campaigns against the Azai and Asakura clans beginning in 1570. Following his victories at the sieges of Odani and Ichijōdani Castles in 1573, he took the skulls of Azai Nagamasa, his father Hisamasa, and Asakura Yoshikage and had them prepared for display and for use as sake cups (o-choko). Unlike skull cups of other cultures, which might resemble a bowl or a chalice in the finished form, the Japanese artisans excised a shallow, saucer-shaped portion from the top of the each skull, then lacquered the skulls, covered them in gold leaf, and each cup was set in the aperture from which it had been cut, concave side up. Nobunaga then presented the three skulls to his vassals and drank sake from the cups, in order to demonstrate the fate of those who would oppose or betray him. The three skulls were probably lost when Azuchi Castle was destroyed in 1582.

Europe

According to Herodotus' Histories and Strabo's Geographica, the Scythians killed their enemies and made their skulls into drinking cups.

Edouard Chavannes quotes Livy to illustrate the ceremonial use of skull cups by the Boii, a Celtic tribe in Europe, in 216 BC.

According to Paul the Deacon's Historia Langobardorum, when the Lombard king Alboin defeated the Gepids, the hereditary enemies of his people, in 567 AD, he then slew their new king Cunimund, fashioned a drinking-cup from his skull, and took his daughter Rosamund as a wife.

Khan Krum of the First Bulgarian Empire was said by Theophanes the Confessor, Joannes Zonaras, the Manasses Chronicle, and others, to have made a jeweled cup from the skull of the Byzantine emperor Nicephorus I (811 AD) after killing him in the Battle of Pliska.

The Kievan Rus' Primary Chronicle reports that the skull of Svyatoslav I of Kiev was made into a chalice by the Pecheneg Khan Kurya in 972 AD. He likely intended this as a compliment to Sviatoslav; sources report that Kurya and his wife drank from the skull and prayed for a son as brave as the deceased Rus warlord.

According to George Akropolites the skull of Baldwin I of Constantinople was made into a drinking cup by the Tsar Kaloyan of Bulgaria (c.  1205).

According to legend, after the pirate Blackbeard was killed and beheaded in 1718, his skull was made into a drinking cup.

In 19th century Britain, the poet Lord Byron used a skull his gardener had found at Newstead Abbey as a drinking vessel. According to Lord Byron,  Byron even wrote a darkly witty drinking poem as if inscribed upon it,  “Lines Inscribed upon a Cup Formed from a Skull”. The cup, filled with claret, was passed around "in imitation of the Goths of old", among the Order of the Skull that Byron founded at Newstead, "whilst many a grim joke was cut at its expense", Byron recalled to Thomas Medwin.

See also
 Kapala
 Noggin (cup)

References

Further reading

Drinkware
Human head and neck
Human trophy collecting
Indo-European culture